Genetti Hotel, based in Williamsport, Pennsylvania, was built in 1921. It was originally named Lycoming Hotel.

History 
The hotel was built in 1921, in the midst of Williamsport's logging boom. The hotel opened on June 21, 1922, as Lycoming Hotel.

The hotel's architect was New Jersey-born William Lee Stoddart.

Construction 

The Genetti took a little over a year to build, with construction starting in 1921 and the project being completed in 1922. It is the tallest building in Williamsport.

The hotel has been through many renovations, such as a new modern ballroom, new elevators, and a restoration of the hotel's exterior.

See also
Georgian Terrace Hotel
Ellis Hotel
Penn Tower

References

External links

Hotels in Pennsylvania
Buildings and structures in Williamsport, Pennsylvania
1922 establishments in Pennsylvania
Hotels established in 1922
Hotel buildings completed in 1922